Miercurea (Romanian for "[The] Wednesday") starts off the names of several places in Romania:

Miercurea Ciuc
Miercurea Nirajului
Miercurea Sibiului